A pataca (or patacão) is a unit of currency, and an avo is  of a pataca. Pataca is the Portuguese name for peso. The following articles contain more information (list may not contain all historical patacas):

Macanese pataca
Maltese pataca
Portuguese Timorese pataca